Shuntaro Hida (1 January 1917 – 20 March 2017) was a Japanese physician who was an eyewitness when the Little Boy atomic bomb was dropped on Hiroshima by the Enola Gay on 6 August 1945. He treated survivors as a medical doctor and wrote about the effects of radiation on the human body.

The night before the bomb was dropped 28-year-old Dr. Hida left the Hiroshima Military Hospital where he was stationed as an army medical officer to attend to a sick child in the village of Hesaka. He was therefore approximately 6 kilometers from ground zero when the bomb was dropped and he looked up and saw the Boeing B-29 Superfortress aircraft which he described as appearing like a "tiny silver drop". He then felt the heat and blast from the explosion and saw the mushroom cloud over the city. As a medical doctor he treated the wounded and saw the short- and long-term effects of radiation on the human body.

After the war he continued to treat atomic bomb survivors (known as Hibakusha) for many years and he became the Director of the Hibakusha Counselling Centre. He also sought compensation from the United States government and advocated the abolition of nuclear weapons. In 2005 he was interviewed for the BBC drama documentary Hiroshima and his experiences were re-enacted in a dramatic reconstruction of events. He was also interviewed for the documentary White Light/Black Rain: The Destruction of Hiroshima and Nagasaki in 2006.

Dr. Shuntaro Hida appears in the documentary Atomic Wounds by Journeyman Pictures. "At 89, Doctor Hida, a survivor of the 1945 atomic bomb at Hiroshima, continues to care for some of the other quarter of a million survivors. Atomic Wounds retraces his dedicated journey and highlights how the terrible danger of radiation was concealed by successive American administrations of the 1950s to 1970s so that nuclear power could be freely developed, with no concern for public health." He died from pneumonia on 20 March 2017 at the age of 100.

His wife died in 2015 then Hida moved in with his son and daughter-in-law. He died of pneumonia.

References

External links
 Under the Mushroom-Shaped Cloud in Hiroshima - a memoir by Shuntaro Hida M.D.
 

1917 births
2017 deaths
Hibakusha
Japanese centenarians
Men centenarians
Japanese military doctors
Nihon University alumni
People of Shōwa-period Japan
Imperial Japanese Army personnel of World War II
Imperial Japanese Army officers